Tristan Toleno is an American politician, chef, and businessman serving as a member of the Vermont House of Representatives from the Windham-2-3 district.

Early life and education 
A native of Marlboro, Vermont, Toleno graduated from Brattleboro Union High School. After earning a Bachelor of Arts degree in philosophy and religious studies at Wesleyan University, Toleno earned an Associate's degree in culinary arts from the New England Culinary Institute and decided to pursue a culinary career.

Career 
After graduating from culinary school, Toleno moved to New York City and worked as a chef. Toleno and his wife, Susie, eventually returned to Marlboro, where Toleno earned his Master of Business Administration from Marlboro College and began managing restaurants. Toleno later established two catering companies. Toleno was elected to the Vermont House of Representatives in 2012. He also serves as Assistant Majority Leader of the House.

Toleno has also worked as a professor of management at Marlboro College. He served as the interim director of the Marlboro College Graduate School.

References 

Living people
Democratic Party members of the Vermont House of Representatives
Wesleyan University alumni
Marlboro College alumni
People from Marlboro, Vermont
21st-century American politicians
Year of birth missing (living people)